The B. S. Varian House, at 241 Main St. in Weiser, Idaho, is an architect-designed house which was built in 1909.  It was designed by John E. Tourtellotte and Company.

It is a large Bungalow-style house with both front-facing and cross gables.  It is unusual for its size and for its shingle siding.  The Idaho State Historical Society inventory of the house states: "The house is massive for a bungalow, with a thirty-six-by-fifty-four-foot perimeter and an additional cross gable which allows a full four bedrooms and a sleeping porch to be included under the low gabled roof of the upper half story."

References

Houses on the National Register of Historic Places in Idaho
Bungalow architecture in Idaho
Houses completed in 1909
Washington County, Idaho